Pantai Jerejak is a state constituency in Penang, Malaysia, that has been represented in the Penang State Legislative Assembly since 2004. It covers a portion of southeastern Penang Island, including Bayan Baru and the northern half of the Bayan Lepas Free Industrial Zone.

The state constituency was first contested in 2004 and is mandated to return a single Assemblyman to the Penang State Legislative Assembly under the first-past-the-post voting system. , the State Assemblyman for Pantai Jerejak is Saifuddin Nasution Ismail from Parti Keadilan Rakyat (PKR), which is part of the state's ruling coalition, Pakatan Harapan (PH).

Definition 
The Pantai Jerejak constituency contains the polling districts of Bandar Bayan Baru, Jalan Mahsuri, Jalan Tengah, Taman Melati, Pantai Jerejak, Pintasan Bahagia and Taman Sri Nibong. According to a proposed redelineation exercise in 2016, Taman Melati is to be renamed as Lebuh Mahsuri.

This state constituency encompasses all of the neighbourhood of Bayan Baru, as well as the northern half of the Bayan Lepas Free Industrial Zone. Among the landmarks within the state seat are SPICE Arena and Queensbay Mall.

In addition, the Pantai Jerejak constituency contains Jerejak Island, a large uninhabited islet just off the southeastern coast of Penang Island.

Polling districts 
According to the federal gazette issued on 30 March 2018, the Pantai Jerejak constituency is divided into 7 polling districts.

Demographics

History

Election results 
The electoral results for the Pantai Jerejak state constituency in 2008, 2013 and 2018 are as follows.

See also 
 Constituencies of Penang

References 

Penang state constituencies